The eleventh and final season of the American comedy series Will & Grace premiered on October 24, 2019, and consisted of 18 episodes, ending on April 23, 2020. The season was initially going to premiere midseason, but was moved up after the cancellation of Sunnyside.

Production
In March 2018, NBC ordered five more episodes for Will & Grace'''s revival's second season, bringing the total to 18 episodes, and it was also renewed for an 18-episode third season. On July 25, 2019, it was announced that the eleventh season will be the final season of the series after mutual agreement between the show's cast and creators.

It was reported on October 24, 2019, that Megan Mullally would be absent from two episodes of this season amidst rumors of alleged on-set tension between her and co-stars Debra Messing and Sean Hayes. Mullally was absent from the seventh episode, "What a Dump," and the tenth episode, "Of Mouse and Men." After missing the two episodes, Mulally returned to complete the series. Mulally alluded to being "bullied" by Messing on set during an episode of her podcast co-hosted by her husband Nick Offerman. 

Show creators David Kohan and Max Mutchnick said the season would tackle a number of issues such as the MeToo movement and address ignorance towards bisexuality, as well as a finale that focused on a less heteronormative ending.

The cast of the series were reported to have made a significant increase in salary per episode for the final season with the lead actors being paid $470,000 per episode for the reboot series, an increase from the previous series where the lead actors were being paid $150,000 per episode. NBC was said to be paying $3.5 million per episode for the show.

Emmy nominated production designer Glenda Rovello who had been nominated for her work on the previous season also returned for the final season. Rovello hinted that the sets in the final season would be the  most extravagant seen so far. One of the most notable works from the production team was the replica set and costumes created for the episode “We Love Lucy”. The production team created “45 custom-made costume pieces; built exact replicas of the Ricardo apartment, candy factory, Italian wine vineyard and television studio from the Vitameatavegamin commercial; and brought in 14,000 pieces of the same milk chocolate-covered buttercream from See’s Candy, 1,200 pounds of black grapes for wine-stomping and 48 bottles to match the original Vitameatavegamin prop.” .

Awards and nominations

Season 11 of Will & Grace received a total of 5 Primetime Emmy Award nominations for Season 11 from the Academy of Television Arts & Sciences. Will and Grace has received a total of 18 awards and 88 nominations during its entire run.

Reception

While the previous two seasons of Will & Grace received generally positive reviews, the eleventh and  final season received mixed to negative reviews from critics. 

Tara Ariano from Vanity Fair criticized the series finale as well as other comparative attempts at television reboots, remarking that "another unnecessary TV revival fizzles out with its second series finale." Ariano also criticized the show for relying too heavily on guest stars in each episode and the rehashing of previous storylines from the original series.

Matthew Gilbert from the Boston Globe described the final season as a "joyless affair", noting that the writing seemed "forced and desperate for material". In regards to the actors he believed that the chemistry between actors that was present in previous seasons had dissipated: "At one point, the Will & Grace four — Debra Messing, Megan Mullally, Eric McCormack, and Sean Hayes — were among TV's best ensembles, with perfectly timed delivery, expert physical comedy, and a familiarity with one another that shone through the material. Now, the crackle is gone and the chemistry feels labored." He also cited  the alleged feud between Mulally and other cast members as a possible reason for this.

Cristina Iskander rated the mid-season finale episode of the series "The Grief Panda" two out of five stars, stating the episode was a "sad state of affairs" and draws comparison  to the criticized final season of the original series. The "show runners have a rare second chance to get things right, they are completely wasting that opportunity". She also criticized the writing for the  episode's guest star Vanessa Bayer, stating that "the show doesn't utilise her character in any way that feels purposeful or even particularly funny."

Sal Cinequemani from Slant wrote positively about the episode "We Love Lucy" and praised the replica set design and costumes made to recreate scenes from the 1950s sitcom I Love Lucy''. The production design of "We Love Lucy" was nominated for an Emmy for the category of Outstanding Production Design For A Narrative Program (Half-Hour). Cinequemani praised Messing's performance of character Lucy Ricardo and actress Lucille Ball, saying she "pitch-perfectly fills Lucy's shoes".  Cinequemani also praised Mulally's comedic performance playing a number of side characters in the episode.

Cast and characters

Main
 Eric McCormack as Will Truman
 Debra Messing as Grace Adler
 Megan Mullally as Karen Walker
 Sean Hayes as Jack McFarland

Recurring
 Brian Jordan Alvarez as Estéfan Gloria-McFarland
 Matt Bomer as McCoy Whitman
 Patton Oswalt as Danley Walker

Special guest stars
 Chris Parnell as Dr. DiLorenzo
 Vanessa Bayer as Amy/Friday
 Demi Lovato as Jenny
 Miss Coco Peru as Herself
 Aileen Quinn as Ramona Delaney
 Joel McHale as Phil
 Ryan Phillippe as Himself
 Gus Kenworthy as Slutty Steve
 Billie Lourd as Fiona Adler
 Tim Bagley as Larry
 Lucie Arnaz as Factory Boss
 Leslie Jordan as Beverly Leslie
 Minnie Driver as Lorraine Finster

Guest
 Patricia Belcher as Ellie
 Livia Treviño as Mrs. Timmer
 Reid Scott as Marcus
 Paul Ben-Victor as Mario
 Dylan Riley Snyder as DJ
 Charles Berthoud as Paolo
 Karan Soni as Mike
 Ali Wentworth as Dr. Superstein
 Meredith Salenger as Lucy
 Ben Giroux as Grief Panda
 Nicole Sullivan as Ruth
 T.R. Knight as Dexter Murphy
 Christopher Thornton as Luke
 Matt Cook as Ross Elliot
 Sarah Baker as Cathy

Episodes

Reception

Ratings

References

2019 American television seasons
2020 American television seasons
11
Television episodes directed by James Burrows